PMH may stand for:

 Phú Mỹ Hưng urban area, a planned city in Vietnam 
 Greater Portsmouth Regional Airport, IATA code 
 OAI-PMH, the OAI Protocol for Metadata Harvesting
 Past medical history
 Princess Margaret Hospital (disambiguation), various hospitals